Ali Bryan is a Canadian novelist, and personal trainer. Her second novel, "The Figgs", was shortlisted for the 2019 Stephen Leacock Medal for Humour.

Biography
Bryan was born in Nova Scotia, where she graduated from Saint Mary's University, then studied creative writing under Paul Quarrington at Humber College, in Ontario.

Her first novel, published in 2013, was titled Roost.  Roost's protagonist, Claudia, is a single mother, in her thirties.  Her life goes out of control following the unexpected death of her mother.

Bryan was a finalist in the 2010 CBC Canada Writes literary contest.  She came third in the 2012 CBC Canada Writes Literary Triathlon. Roost won the Georges Bugnet Award for Fiction, and was short-listed for the Alberta Trade Fiction Book of the Year.  One Book Nova Scotia chose Roost for its annual provincial reading initiative - where all Nova Scotians were encouraged to read the same book at the same time. In 2016, she was shortlisted for the Alberta Literary Awards Jon Whyte Memorial Essay Award. In 2018, Bryan shared Alberta's Emerging Artists Award with 9 other writers.

References

21st-century Canadian novelists
Canadian women novelists
Living people
Writers from Alberta
21st-century Canadian women writers
Year of birth missing (living people)